Thomas Roussel Davids Byles (26 February 1870 – 15 April 1912) was an English Catholic priest who was a passenger aboard the  on its maiden voyage when it sank after striking an iceberg during the night of 14–15 April 1912. He was reported as being amidst the throng of trapped passengers on the ship's rear deck in its final moments of descent, audibly praying.

Life
Thomas Byles was born Roussel Davids Byles in Leeds, Yorkshire, the eldest of seven children of Alfred Holden Byles, a Congregationalist minister, and his wife Louisa Davids. He attended Leamington College and Rossall School, Fleetwood, Lancashire, between 1885 and 1889, then went to Balliol College, Oxford, in 1889 to study theology, graduating with a Bachelor of Arts degree in 1894. While at Oxford, Byles converted to the Church of England, and later, like his younger brother William had done before, to the Roman Catholic faith, taking the name Thomas. In 1899, he went to the Beda College in Rome to study for the priesthood and was ordained in 1902. He was assigned to St Helen's Parish in Chipping Ongar, Essex in 1905, where he would remain until his death.

An invitation to officiate at the wedding of his younger brother William prompted Byles to make the trip to New York City. He said Mass on the morning of the sinking, Octave of Easter, (now known as Divine Mercy Sunday), 14 April 1912, for both second-and third-class passengers in their respective lounges. The sermon was on the need for a spiritual lifeboat in the shape of prayer and the sacraments when in danger of spiritual shipwreck in times of temptation.

Byles was walking on the upper deck praying his breviary when the Titanic struck the iceberg. As the ship was sinking, he assisted many third-class passengers up to the boat deck to the lifeboats. He reputedly twice refused a place on a lifeboat. Toward the end he recited the Rosary and other prayers, heard confessions  and gave absolution to more than a hundred passengers who remained trapped on the stern of the ship after all of the lifeboats had been launched. His body, if recovered, was never identified. His brothers installed a door in his memory at St Helen's Catholic Church in Chipping Ongar, Essex. Pope Pius X later described Byles as a "martyr for the Church".

Beatification process
In April 2015, Graham Smith, the current priest of St Helen's Church, with support of Bishop Alan Williams of the Diocese of Brentwood, initiated the first steps toward declaring Byles a saint.

In popular culture
Byles has three times been portrayed in films about the disaster. In the 1979 television movie S.O.S. Titanic, he was portrayed by Matthew Guinness. In the 1997 film, Titanic, he was portrayed by James Lancaster, reciting the Rosary and Revelation 21:4. Richard Basehart plays a thinly disguised Byles in the 1953 film. His story is featured in a book written by Cady Crosby entitled A Titanic Hero: Thomas Byles.

References

External links
 Website dedicated to Father Thomas Byles
 Encyclopedia Titanica
 Titanic Memorial
 Titanic: A Voyage of Discovery
 

1870 births
1912 deaths
Converts to Roman Catholicism from Anglicanism
Deaths on the RMS Titanic
20th-century English Roman Catholic priests
People educated at Rossall School
Clergy from Leeds
People from Chipping Ongar